ISO 3166-2:MV is the entry for Maldives in ISO 3166-2, part of the ISO 3166 standard published by the International Organization for Standardization (ISO), which defines codes for the names of the principal subdivisions (e.g., provinces or states) of all countries coded in ISO 3166-1.

Currently for Maldives, ISO 3166-2 codes are defined for two cities and 19 administrative atolls.

Each code consists of two parts, separated by a hyphen. The second part is one of the following:
 three letters: Malé
 two digits: Addu City and administrative atolls

Current codes
Subdivision names are listed as in the ISO 3166-2 standard published by the ISO 3166 Maintenance Agency (ISO 3166/MA).

ISO 639-1 codes are used to represent subdivision names in the following administrative languages:
 (en): English
 (dv): Dhivehi

Click on the button in the header to sort each column.

Cities

Administrative atolls

Notes

Changes
The following changes to the entry have been announced by the ISO 3166/MA since the first publication of ISO 3166-2 in 1998. ISO stopped issuing newsletters in 2013.

Former provinces
Provinces were abolished in 2010 and their codes removed in 2018:

See also
 Subdivisions of the Maldives
 FIPS region codes of Maldives

External links
 ISO Online Browsing Platform: MV
 Provinces of Maldives, Statoids.com

2:MV
ISO 3166-2
ISO 3166-2
Maldives geography-related lists